Vasselon is a surname. Notable people with the surname include:

Marius Vasselon (1841–1924), French painter
Pascal Vasselon (born 1963), French automotive engineer